Odetta is a genus of small sea snails, marine gastropod molluscs in the subfamily Odostomiinae, which is a voluminous taxon of minute marine gastropods with a heterostrophic protoconch.

Taxonomy
According to Gary Rosenberg's Malacolog however, "Odetta" is not a valid genus name. It is considered to be an unavailable name, because it was published as a "nomen nudum". However, by including the type species in Megastomia, Peñas & Rolán (1999) implicitly treated Odetta as a synonym of Megastomia, contra van Aartsen, Gittenberger & Goud (1998) who hold it as a valid genus and are followed by the database WoRMS.

Species
 Odetta appeliusi (Hornung & Mermod, 1924)
 Odetta bosyuensis (Nomura, 1937)
 Odetta dekleini van Aartsen, Gittenberger E. & Goud, 1998
 Odetta lirata (A. Adams, 1860)
 Odetta marci van Aartsen, Gittenberger & Goud, 1998
 Odetta sulcata (de Folin, 1870)
 Odetta tenpeii (Nomura, 1937)
 Odetta zekiergeni Öztürk, 2013
Species brought into synonymy
 Odetta digitalis (Dall & Bartsch, 1906): synonym of Leucotina digitalis (Dall & Bartsch, 1906): synonym of Monotygma amoena (A. Adams, 1853)
 Odetta felix (Dall & Bartsch, 1906): synonym of Oscilla felix (Dall & Bartsch, 1906)
 Odetta lectissima (Dall & Bartsch, 1906): synonym of Iolaea lectissima (Dall & Bartsch, 1906)

References

 de Folin L. 1870. D'une méthode de classification pour les coquilles de la famille des Chemnitzidae. Annales de la Société Linnéenne du Département du Maine et Loire 12: 191-202
 Gittenberger E. & Goud J. (1998). Pyramidellidae (Mollusca, Gastropoda, Heterobranchia) collected duning the Dutch CANCAP and MAURITANIA expeditions in the south-eastern part of the North Atlantic Ocean (part 1). Zoologische Verhandelingen (Leiden) 321 : 1-57
 See the Malacolog entry at 
 Nomenclator Zoologicus info

Pyramidellidae